Rubina Francis (born 1999) is an Indian para pistol shooter. She is currently ranked number five by the International Shooting Sport Federation in Women's 10m Air Pistol SH1 (World Shooting Para Sport Rankings) and she also participated in the 2018 Asian Para Games P2 - Women's 10M Air Pistol (SH1 Events).

2020 Summer Paralympics 
She qualified for the 2020 Summer Paralympics in Tokyo, Japan

References

1999 births
Living people
Indian female sport shooters
Paralympic shooters of India
People from Madhya Pradesh
People from Jabalpur
Shooters at the 2020 Summer Paralympics